In Greek mythology, the name Arge (Ancient Greek:  Ἄργη) may refer to:

Arge, a nymph daughter of Zeus and Hera.
Arge, a huntress. When she was pursuing a stag, she boasted that she would catch up with the animal even if it ran as fast as Helios. The sun god, offended by her words, changed her into a doe.
Arge, one of the two maidens from Hyperborea (the other one being Opis), who came to Delos together with Apollo and Artemis and received honors from the Delians till the end of their lives.
Arge, a nymph from Lyctus, Crete. She was abducted by Zeus and brought by him to Mount Argyllus in Egypt, where she gave birth to a son, Dionysus. This version of the story of Dionysus' birth is only found in Pseudo-Plutarch's On Rivers.

Notes

References 
 Gaius Julius Hyginus, Fabulae from The Myths of Hyginus translated and edited by Mary Grant. University of Kansas Publications in Humanistic Studies. Online version at the Topos Text Project.
 Herodotus, The Histories with an English translation by A. D. Godley. Cambridge. Harvard University Press. 1920. Online version at the Topos Text Project. Greek text available at Perseus Digital Library.
 Lucius Mestrius Plutarchus, Morals translated from the Greek by several hands. Corrected and revised by. William W. Goodwin, PH. D. Boston. Little, Brown, and Company. Cambridge. Press Of John Wilson and son. 1874. 5. Online version at the Perseus Digital Library.

Nymphs
Metamorphoses into animals in Greek mythology
Helios in mythology
Retinue of Artemis
Cretan characters in Greek mythology
Children of Zeus
Children of Hera